Cloyes-sur-le-Loir (literally Cloyes on the Loir) is a former commune on the River Loir, a few kilometres south of the town of Châteaudun in the department of Eure-et-Loir in northern France. On 1 January 2017, it was merged into the new commune Cloyes-les-Trois-Rivières.

Population

Personalities

It was the home of Stephen of Cloyes, a leader of the Children's Crusade. Mezzo-soprano Juliette Borghèse was born in the town.

See also
Communes of the Eure-et-Loir department

References

External links

Official website (in French)

Former communes of Eure-et-Loir